Crypsedra gemmea is a moth of the family Noctuidae. It is found in Central and Northern Europe.

Technical description and variation

C. gemmea Tr. (32 f). Superficially resembling L. viridana, the ground colour being the same olive- brown and the markings black and white; the orbicular stigma, however, is always round, not irregular in shape; the claviform of the ground colour, black-edged, sometimes with a few whitish scales in it, and of the ordinary shape, not triangular; the costal area is sprinkled with white scales; submarginal line white, preceded by black dentate marks; fringe brown with fine white chequering; hindwing in both sexes brownish grey, paler towards base, with cellspot and veins dark. Larva glossy bluish or greenish grey; tubercles black carrying a single pale hair; head, thoracic, and anal plates black brown. The length of the fore-wings is 16–20 mm.

Biology
The moth flies from July to September depending on the location.

The larvae feed on various grasses, but prefer Molinia caerulea.

References

External links

Fauna Europaea
Lepiforum.de
Vlindernet.nl 
Norwegian moths and butterflies - The Cameo

Cuculliinae
Moths of Europe
Taxa named by Georg Friedrich Treitschke